The 1983 San Marino Grand Prix was a Formula One motor race held at Imola on 1 May 1983. It was the fourth race of the 1983 FIA Formula One World Championship.

Frenchman Patrick Tambay took a popular victory in his Ferrari in front of a delighted Tifosi. Driving the #27 car, Tambay dedicated his win to the man he had replaced in the Ferrari team, the late Gilles Villeneuve. It was almost a perfect weekend for the Maranello-based team with René Arnoux qualifying on pole and finishing third. Renault's Alain Prost finished in second place, passing Arnoux with three laps left after the #28 Ferrari spun at the Acque Minerali chicane.

Brabham driver Riccardo Patrese had taken the lead from Tambay with six laps remaining, but only held the lead for half a lap before crashing at Acque Minerali. He later described the accident as "purely my mistake". Showing their love for Ferrari more than for an Italian driver in a non-Italian car, the Tifosi cheered as Patrese handed the lead back to Tambay.

This would be the last time that Ferrari founder Enzo Ferrari saw his Formula One team score a victory in person. Enzo never attended races outside Italy at the time, and Ferrari would not win on Italian soil again until after Enzo died in 1988. Ferrari would not win at Imola again until Michael Schumacher in 1999. As of 2020, this remains the last race where all three drivers on the podium were of the same nationality.

Classification

Qualifying

Race

Championship standings after the race

Drivers' Championship standings

Constructors' Championship standings

References

San Marino Grand Prix
San Marino Grand Prix
San Marino Grand Prix
May 1983 sports events in Europe